Charles Whittlesey Power  was an American businessman and politician who served as Mayor of Pittsfield, Massachusetts.

Notes

1869 births
Massachusetts Republicans
Mayors of Pittsfield, Massachusetts
Year of death missing